The Hugo Award for Best Fancast is one of the Hugo Awards, and is awarded to the best non-professional audio or video periodical devoted to science fiction, fantasy, or related subjects. The Hugo Awards have been described as "a fine showcase for speculative fiction" and "the best known literary award for science fiction writing".

To be eligible for the award, a fancast must have released four or more episodes by the end of the previous calendar year, at least one of which appeared in that year, and it must not qualify for the dramatic presentation category. It must also not provide or be published by an entity that provides a quarter or more of the income of any one person working on the fancast. The name of the award is a portmanteau of fan and podcast. The Hugo Award for Best Fancast was first proposed as a category after the 2011 awards, and then appeared as a temporary category at the 2012 awards. Temporary awards are not required to be repeated in following years. The 2013 awards, however, did repeat the category, and afterwards it was ratified as a permanent category.

During the 11 years the award has been active, 28 fancasts by 80 people have been nominated, and 7 of those fancasts have won. SF Squeecast, created by a team of five people, won the award in both 2012 and 2013, and declined to be nominated for 2014. SF Signal Podcast, run by Patrick Hester, won the 2014 award, and Galactic Suburbia Podcast, run by Alisa Krasnostein, Alexandra Pierce, Tansy Rayner Roberts, and Andrew Finch, won the 2015 award. No award was given in 2016, and Tea and Jeopardy, by Emma Newman and Peter Newman, won in 2017 on its third nomination. Ditch Diggers, by Mur Lafferty and Matt Wallace, won the 2018 award in its second year of nominations, and Our Opinions Are Correct, by Annalee Newitz and Charlie Jane Anders, won the 2019, 2020, and 2022 awards. The Coode Street Podcast, by Jonathan Strahan and Gary K. Wolfe, won in 2021. Galactic Suburbia Podcast and The Coode Street Podcast have received the most nominations at eight each.

Selection
Hugo Award nominees and winners are chosen by supporting or attending members of the annual World Science Fiction Convention, or Worldcon, and the awards presentation constitutes its central event. Supporting members are those who do not attend the convention itself, and pay a smaller membership fee as a result. The selection process is defined in the World Science Fiction Society Constitution as instant-runoff voting with six nominees, except in the case of a tie. The fancasts on the ballot are the six most-nominated by members that year, with no limit on the number of fancasts that can be nominated. Initial nominations are made by members in January through March, while voting on the ballot of six nominations is performed roughly in April through July, subject to change depending on when that year's Worldcon is held. Prior to 2017, the final ballot was five works; it was changed that year to six, with each initial nominator limited to five nominations. Worldcons are generally held near the start of September, and are held in a different city around the world each year. Members are permitted to vote "no award", if they feel that none of the nominees is deserving of the award that year, and in the case that "no award" takes the majority the Hugo is not given in that category. This happened in the Best Fancast category in 2016.

Winners and nominees
In the following table, the years correspond to the date of the ceremony, rather than when the story was first published. Entries with a blue background have won the award; those with a white background are the other nominated works.

  *   Winners
  +   No award

References

External links
 Official website

Fancast
Podcasting awards